Serge David Gnabry (born 14 July 1995) is a German professional footballer who plays as a winger for the  club Bayern Munich and the Germany national team.

Gnabry started his career in England with Arsenal in the Premier League, making his professional debut in September 2012. He also had a brief spell on loan with West Bromwich Albion before moving back to Germany to join Werder Bremen in 2016. In 2017, he signed for Bayern Munich before being loaned to 1899 Hoffenheim for the 2017–18 season. In 2018–19, his first season with Bayern Munich, he won the Bundesliga title and was named their Player of the Season. The following season, Gnabry scored 23 goals as Bayern sealed a continental treble consisting of the Bundesliga, DFB-Pokal and UEFA Champions League.

After appearing for Germany at various youth levels, Gnabry made his senior international debut in November 2016 in a 2018 FIFA World Cup qualification match against San Marino, scoring a hat-trick in an 8–0 win. He represented Germany at UEFA Euro 2020 and the 2022 FIFA World Cup.

Early life
Gnabry was born in Stuttgart, Baden-Württemberg to an Ivorian father and a German mother. In his youth, Gnabry was a talented sprinter but ultimately chose football over athletics.

Club career

Arsenal

Early career
Gnabry's former club VfB Stuttgart agreed to a £100,000 deal with Premier League club Arsenal in 2010, but he had to wait until 2011, when he was 16, to join. Gnabry officially joined Arsenal for the 2011–12 season. He played for the under-18s for the majority of the season but was then promoted to the reserves after impressive displays. By the end of the season, Gnabry had played six games, scoring two goals.

2012–15: Development and limited gametime

The 2012–13 season started off well for Gnabry after he was called up to the Arsenal first team for a pre-season friendly against FC Köln. He played 24 minutes after coming on at half-time and was replaced by Marouane Chamakh in the 69th minute. He then made his professional first-team debut for Arsenal on 26 September 2012 against Coventry City in the League Cup as a 72nd-minute substitute for Alex Oxlade-Chamberlain as Arsenal routed Coventry 6–1. On 20 October 2012, he made his Premier League debut in the 1–0 defeat against Norwich City at Carrow Road. At 17 years and 98 days, he became Arsenal's second-youngest player in the league's history after Jack Wilshere. Four days later, he made his UEFA Champions League debut, coming on as a substitute in Arsenal's 2–0 home loss to Schalke 04.

In the first game of the 2013–14 season, Gnabry was included in Arsenal's first-team squad against Aston Villa and started the game on the bench. He then made his first start for the club on 22 September 2013 in the Premier League against Stoke City after Theo Walcott was ruled out just before kick-off. He played 73 minutes before being subbed out for Ryo Miyaichi as Arsenal won the match 3–1. He scored his first professional goal in the next league match against Swansea City to lead Arsenal to a 2–1 victory and leave them top of the Premier League table. On 26 October, he won a penalty away at Crystal Palace in an eventual 2–0 victory for Arsenal. Gnabry's impressive start to the season resulted in a nomination for the 2013 Golden Boy Award, and a new five-year contract with Arsenal.

Gnabry went on to make 14 appearances in the 2013–14 season, including impressive performances in the FA Cup against Tottenham Hotspur and Coventry, with Gnabry helping Arsenal go on to win the tournament that year, featuring on the bench in the next two games against Liverpool and Everton.

Following his breakout season, Gnabry missed most of the 2014–15 season due to a serious knee injury which kept him away from the first team for over a year.

Loan to West Bromwich Albion
On 7 August 2015, Gnabry joined West Bromwich Albion on a season-long loan to gain first-team experience. He made his debut as a substitute in a 3–2 defeat to Chelsea on 23 August 2015. However, he did not make any further league appearances, with manager Tony Pulis stating in October that Gnabry was "not at the required level" to play for West Brom. In January, he was recalled from his loan after lacking first-team action at West Brom. He finished the 2015–16 season with one Premier League appearance and two League Cup appearances.

Werder Bremen
On 31 August 2016, Gnabry signed for Bundesliga club Werder Bremen for a reported transfer fee of £5 million. Arsenal manager Arsène Wenger had wanted to extend Gnabry's contract at Arsenal before his move, but a lack of first-team opportunities meant that the midfielder sought a move elsewhere.

He scored his first goal for Werder Bremen on 17 September 2016 in a 4–1 away loss to Borussia Mönchengladbach.

In his single season at the club, he made 27 league appearances scoring 11 goals while Werder Bremen finished 8th in the Bundesliga.

Bayern Munich

Loan to 1899 Hoffenheim
On 11 June 2017, Bayern Munich announced the signing of Gnabry on a three-year contract for €8 million after activating a clause in his contract with Werder Bremen. On 14 June, Bayern Munich announced that Serge Gnabry was moving to 1899 Hoffenheim on a season-long loan. Gnabry had wished for the move to gain more experience. He scored his first and second league goal in the 4–0 victory over RB Leipzig. He scored 10 goals in his 22 appearances in the season helping Hoffenheim to finish third in the league table and secured a Champions League spot for the next season. He finished the 2017–18 season with 10 goals in 26 appearances. He also made an appearance in the Regionalliga Südwest for the reserve team.

2018–2020: Breakthrough and silverware

On 2 July 2018, Gnabry was presented as a Bayern Munich player. Gnabry was assigned the jersey number 22. On 1 September, Gnabry made his Bundesliga debut for Bayern Munich in a 3–0 win at Stuttgart when he came on as a substitute in the 77th minute. On 3 November 2018, Gnabry scored his first Bundesliga goal for Bayern Munich in a 1–1 draw against Freiburg. On 1 December 2018, Gnabry scored two goals in a 2–1 win against his former club Werder Bremen. On 2 March 2019, Gnabry scored Bayern Munich's 4000th Bundesliga goal during a 5–1 win over Gladbach, helping the club become the first team to achieve the milestone. On 5 March 2019, he signed a new contract with Bayern Munich until June 2023, and finished the Bundesliga season as Bayern's second top scorer with 10 goals in 30 matches. He won his first Bundesliga title as Bayern finished two points above Borussia Dortmund with 78 points.

On 1 October 2019, Gnabry scored four goals in the 2019–20 UEFA Champions League 7–2 away win against Tottenham Hotspur. On 25 February 2020, he scored a brace against Chelsea in the first leg of the Champions League round of 16 in a 3–0 away win. This made him the first player to score six away goals in London in a single edition of the Champions League. On 14 August, he scored one goal in an 8–2 win against Barcelona in the quarter-finals. On 19 August, he scored a brace in a 3–0 win over Lyon in the semi-finals; hence, he has scored nine goals in nine matches in the competition. Bayern won 1–0 over Paris Saint-Germain in the final, to be his first Champions League title along with his teammate Joshua Kimmich, another VfB Stuttgart academy product.

2020–2022: Contract extension
Gnabry started the 2020–21 season by acquiring the No. 7 shirt, after Franck Ribéry who had worn it for eleven years. In the first match of the season, Gnabry scored a hat-trick in an 8–0 win over Schalke. This was his first Bundesliga hat-trick.

In July 2022, he signed a new contract with Bayern Munich until June 2026. On 26 October 2022, he provided a hat-trick of assists in a 3–0 away win over Barcelona to secure winning Group C in the 2022–23 Champions League season.

International career

Youth teams and 2016 Summer Olympics

Gnabry represented Germany at various youth levels, including under-16, under-17 and under-18 levels. In 2017, he was part of the U21 team which won the European Under-21 Championship.

On 15 July 2016, Gnabry was selected to for the Germany squad at the 2016 Summer Olympics. On 4 August, he started for Germany against Mexico and scored Germany's first goal after 58 minutes in a 2–2 draw with Mexico. Three days later, he tripled his tally by putting two past South Korea, the second being a stoppage time free kick that helped Germany salvage a point in a 3–3 draw. On 10 August, Gnabry contributed two more goals in a 10–0 defeat of Fiji. In Germany's quarter-final match against Portugal, he scored his sixth goal of the tournament just before half-time as Germany prevailed with a 4–0 win. He ended the tournament as the joint top scorer along with his teammate Nils Petersen, helping Germany to win the silver medal.

Senior team
On 4 November 2016, Gnabry received his first call-up to the German senior team. Seven days later, he scored three goals on his debut in a 2018 World Cup qualifier against San Marino in an 8–0 away win. On 9 October 2019, during a 2–2 friendly international draw with Argentina, Gnabry became the fastest player to reach 10 goals for the nation, doing so in his 11th appearance and beating Miroslav Klose's record by 2 games. On 19 November 2019, he scored three goals in the 6–1 victory against Northern Ireland. It was his second hat-trick in his international career. On 19 May 2021, he was selected to the squad for the UEFA Euro 2020.

Style of play
Gnabry, who could not join Bayern's academy since it was a two-hour drive from his home in Stuttgart, went to Arsenal when he was only 15. He later battled for fitness and first-team minutes, so he was loaned out to West Bromwich, where manager Tony Pulis mentioned that he was not ready for top-flight football, and was not good enough to play at the Hawthorns. Pulis later commented on him after his good performances with Bayern: "I'm amazed. We had him at West Brom, we took him on loan and we could never get him fit. He even got taken off in an Under-21 game and he went back to Arsenal and they sold him on ... To have him at West Brom and seeing him do what he's done is absolutely amazing."

His Arsenal manager Arsène Wenger said in 2020 that "he's creative, he can score goals, right-footed, left-footed, good power, good penetration, very, very clever with the timing of his runs... I knew he would have a great career. He can be a number nine, a number 10... he's a very intelligent player." His coach at Werder Bremen, Alexander Nouri, said: "He is lightning quick, a clinical finisher, but he puts a lot of work now into his defence... now he's making these deep runs back to his own box defending. He's capable of doing this work while on the other hand making deep runs in attack".

Career statistics

Club

International

Germany score listed first, score column indicates score after each Gnabry goal

Honours	
Bayern Munich
Bundesliga: 2018–19, 2019–20, 2020–21, 2021–22
DFB-Pokal: 2018–19, 2019–20
DFL-Supercup: 2020, 2021, 2022
UEFA Champions League: 2019–20
UEFA Super Cup: 2020
FIFA Club World Cup: 2020

Germany Olympic
Summer Olympic Games silver medal: 2016

Germany U21
UEFA European Under-21 Championship: 2017

Individual
Bayern Munich Player of the Season: 2018–19
Bundesliga Player of the Month: October 2019, November 2022
Bundesliga Team of the Season: 2019–20
UEFA Champions League Squad of the Season: 2019–20

References

External links

Profile at the FC Bayern Munich website

1995 births
Living people
Footballers from Stuttgart
German footballers
Association football wingers
Arsenal F.C. players
West Bromwich Albion F.C. players
SV Werder Bremen players
FC Bayern Munich footballers
TSG 1899 Hoffenheim players
TSG 1899 Hoffenheim II players
Premier League players
Bundesliga players
Regionalliga players
UEFA Champions League winning players
Germany youth international footballers
Germany under-21 international footballers
Germany international footballers
UEFA Euro 2020 players
2022 FIFA World Cup players
Olympic footballers of Germany
Olympic silver medalists for Germany
Olympic medalists in football
Footballers at the 2016 Summer Olympics
Medalists at the 2016 Summer Olympics
German expatriate footballers
Expatriate footballers in England
German expatriate sportspeople in England
German people of Ivorian descent
German sportspeople of African descent